The Rural Municipality of St. Andrews No. 287 is a rural municipality (RM) in the Canadian province of Saskatchewan within Census Division No. 12 and  Division No. 6.

History 
The RM of St. Andrews No. 287 incorporated as a rural municipality on December 12, 1910.

Geography

Communities and localities 
The following urban municipalities are surrounded by the RM.

Towns
 Rosetown
 Zealandia

The following unincorporated communities are within the RM.

Special service areas
 Sovereign (dissolved as a village, December 31, 2005)

Localities
 Fortune
 Glamis
 Thrasher

Demographics 

Government 
The RM of St. Andrews No. 287 is governed by an elected municipal council and an appointed administrator that meets on the second Tuesday of every month. The reeve of the RM is Geoff Legge while its administrator is Joan Babecy. The RM's office is located in Rosetown.

Transportation 
 Saskatchewan Highway 7
 Rosetown Airport

See also 
List of rural municipalities in Saskatchewan

References 

St. Andrews

Division No. 12, Saskatchewan